Karl-Heinz Wirth (born 20 January 1944) is a German former footballer.

He played for SF Hamborn 07 from 1963 to 1965 and Eintracht Frankfurt from 1965 to 1973. He played 138 times in the Bundesliga.

References

External links 
 Karl-Heinz Wirth at eintracht-archiv.de

1944 births
Living people
German footballers
Eintracht Frankfurt players
Bundesliga players
Association football defenders